The Ministry of General Affairs (AZ) is the Dutch Ministry responsible for government policy, planning, information, and the Dutch royal house. The Ministry was created in 1937 and dissolved in 1945, but in 1947 it was reinstated by Prime Minister Louis Beel. The Ministry remained small until 1967, when it was greatly expanded by Prime Minister Piet de Jong. Since his premiership the Ministry has continued to expand to the present day. The Minister of General Affairs is the head of the Ministry who is also Prime Minister and a member of the Cabinet of the Netherlands. The current Minister and Prime Minister is Mark Rutte.

The Ministry is comparable to the German Chancellery, the British Cabinet Office, or the U.S. Executive Office of the President, but its designation as a Ministry emphasises the role of Prime Minister of the Netherlands as  among the ministers of the government.

The Ministry has three responsibilities: coordination of government policy, the Dutch Royal House, and government communications about the royal house and government policy. The Ministry also houses the Secretariat of the Cabinet of the Netherlands.

The main offices of the Ministry are located in the Binnenhof, the political centre of the Netherlands. However, starting fall of 2021, due to the Renovation of the Binnenhof, the Ministry will be moved temporarily (around 5 to 6 years) to the Catshuis. With only about 400 employees, it is by far the smallest Ministry in the Netherlands.

Organisation
The Ministry has currently four Government Agencies and two Directorates:

 Directorate for Royal House Division (CKH)
 Oversight Commission for the Intelligence Services (CTIVD)

State Secretary for General Affairs
There has been one State Secretary for the Ministry of General Affairs. Norbert Schmelzer served as State Secretary for General Affairs in the De Quay cabinet from 19 May 1959 until 24 July 1963.

See also
 List of prime ministers of the Netherlands
 Cabinet department

References

External links
 Ministry of General Affairs

General Affairs
Netherlands
Netherlands
Netherlands
Dutch monarchy
Ministries established in 1937